Lakota High School may refer to:

Lakota High School (North Dakota) — Lakota, North Dakota 
Lakota High School (West Chester, Ohio) — West Chester, Ohio
Lakota High School (Kansas, Ohio) — Kansas, Ohio
Lakota East High School — Middletown, Ohio
Lakota West High School — West Chester, Ohio